The following is  a list of episodes for the Disney Channel Original Series, Even Stevens. The series ran from June 17, 2000, to June 2, 2003 with 65 episodes produced spanning 3 seasons.

Series overview

Episodes

Season 1 (2000-01)

Season 2 (2001-02)

Season 3 (2002-03)

TV film (2003)

External links
 

Lists of American sitcom episodes
Lists of American children's television series episodes
Lists of Disney Channel television series episodes